Moharram Navidkia (born 1 November 1982 in Isfahan, Iran) is an Iranian retired footballer, and was lately the head coach  of Sepahan in Persian Gulf Pro League from 2020 to 2022.

He played for the club for 18 years and was its captain. He usually played as a midfielder. During his career, he dealt with consecutive injuries, which made him unable to regain his top form.

As an international player, he was the former captain of the Iran under-23 team and collected 25 caps for the senior team of Iran, before bidding his farewell in December 2009.
His brother, Rasoul Navidkia is also a professional footballer who plays in Sepahan.

Early years
His original last name was Ghara Gozlu which he changed later to Navidkia. He is an ethnic Azeri originally from Marand, East Azerbaijan.

Club career

He began his career at Sepahan football club in 1998. From 1998 to 2002 he played as the defensive midfielder, while from 2002 and by the suggestion of Farhad Kazemi his playing post has been changed to attacking midfielder. He managed to attract attention during the 2002–03 Iran Premier League season while playing for a team many at first thought to be average, but they won the championship title at the end.

He was selected the best player of IPL for the 2003–04 season and was considered one of the best Iranian players despite his young age. Due to his potential talent, young age, and impressive performances, he was transferred to VfL Bochum even though he was injured at the time of the signing.

He was not able to recover his old form, and went back to Sepahan in 2006 on loan. After the World Cup in Germany, Navidkia signed a contract with Sepahan again. He had difficulties with the injuries during his career in Sepahan and finally in the 2009–10 season he had his most stable season after a few years. He retired from football on 17 October 2016, after playing 16 years at Sepahan.

Club career statistics
Last Update: 11 May 2019 

 Assist Goals

International career
He was first selected to the national team during the West Asian Football Federation tournament in 2002, which was held in Syria. He made his debut for Iran against Jordan in August 2002. His biggest achievement was winning the gold medal of the 2002 Asian Games with Iran U-23 in Busan, where he continued his impressive display during the games.  He played in the 2006 FIFA World Cup qualification for Team Melli.

Having been selected among Iran's reserve men for the 2006 World Cup, he was called up to join the team in Germany to replace injured Sattar Zare. He bid his farewell to national team in December 2009. In May 2011, he was called up to Iran national team by Carlos Queiroz, but he rejected the offer due to his "several injuries and surgeries" which makes him unable to play for both national team and club.

International goals 
Scores and results list Iran's goal tally first.

Managerial record

Awards and honours

Player
Sepahan
Iran Pro League (5): 2002–03, 2009–10, 2010–11, 2011–12, 2014–15
Hazfi Cup (4): 2003–04, 2005–06, 2006–07, 2012–13 
AFC Champions League Runner-up: 2007

Iran U-23
Asian Games: 2002

Iran
WAFF Bronze medal: 2002

Individual
Football Iran News & Events Player of the season: 2002–03, 2012–13
Iranian Footballer of the Year: 2003, 2013

Manager
Sepahan
Iran Pro League Runner-up: 2020–21

References

External links

Moharram Navidkia at TeamMelli.com

1982 births
Living people
Iranian footballers
People from Marand
Iran international footballers
Association football midfielders
Sepahan S.C. footballers
VfL Bochum players
2006 FIFA World Cup players
Persian Gulf Pro League players
Azadegan League players
2. Bundesliga players
Expatriate footballers in Germany
Iranian expatriate footballers
Sportspeople from Isfahan
Asian Games gold medalists for Iran
Asian Games medalists in football
Footballers at the 2002 Asian Games
Medalists at the 2002 Asian Games
Iranian expatriate sportspeople in Germany
Persian Gulf Pro League managers